is a Japanese gymnast and Olympic medalist.

Sports career
Iketani received a bronze medal in floor exercise and in team all-around 1988 Summer Olympics in Seoul.  He received a silver medal in floor exercise and a bronze medal in team all-around 1992 Summer Olympics in Barcelona.

Iketani received a bronze medal in horizontal bar at the 1989 World Artistic Gymnastics Championships in Stuttgart.

Public appearances
Yukio participated in Kinniku Banzuke and won the event "Hand walk".  He participated in four Sasuke tournaments. He cleared the first stage but went out on the second stage in the first tournament. He returned to participate in the 20th tournament but went out on the Log Grip in the first stage. Iketani participated in Sasuke 24 and failed the log grip again. He was then invited in Sasuke 25 where he was able to clear the Rolling Log and the Jump Hang but suddenly was taken out by the Bridge Jump.  His brother is Sasuke veteran Naoki, who made 15 tournament appearances.

Iketani has a brief professional wrestling career in Hustle, where he was known for the ring name Ginga Iketani. He wrestled three times for them between 2007 and 2008, teaming with the face stable Hustle Army.

He represented Democratic Party as a proportional candidate in the Summer 2010 House of Councillors election but lost.

References

External links
 
 
 
 

1970 births
Living people
Japanese male artistic gymnasts
Gymnasts at the 1988 Summer Olympics
Gymnasts at the 1992 Summer Olympics
Olympic gymnasts of Japan
Olympic silver medalists for Japan
Olympic bronze medalists for Japan
Nippon Sport Science University alumni
Olympic medalists in gymnastics
Asian Games medalists in gymnastics
Gymnasts at the 1990 Asian Games
Asian Games silver medalists for Japan
Medalists at the 1990 Asian Games
Medalists at the 1992 Summer Olympics
Medalists at the 1988 Summer Olympics
Medalists at the World Artistic Gymnastics Championships
20th-century Japanese people